The 2005 World U-17 Hockey Challenge was an ice hockey tournament held in Lethbridge, Alberta, Canada between December 29, 2004 and January 4, 2005. The venues used for the tournament were the ENMAX Centre and the Nicholas Sheran Arena. Canada West defeated Canada Pacific 3-1 in the final to claim the gold medal, while Canada Atlantic defeated Canada Ontario to capture the bronze medal.

Challenge results

Preliminary round

Group A

Group B

Final round

Final standings

Scoring leaders

Goaltending leaders
(Minimum 60 minutes played)

External links
Official website

World U-17 Hockey Challenge
U-17
U-17
U-17
U-17
U-17
Sport in Lethbridge
World U-17 Hockey Challenge, 2005
U17
International ice hockey competitions hosted by Canada